Buffalo Rock Company is an independent Pepsi bottler based in Birmingham, Alabama. It was founded in 1901. In addition to bottling Pepsi products, the company produced Grapico in 1981, a grape-flavored soft drink, and a ginger ale under its own brand name.

Buffalo Rock ginger ale is considerably darker in color and has a stronger ginger content than is customary.  Some customers use the term "ginger cola" to describe the taste.  Buffalo Rock and Grapico are sold throughout Alabama, parts of Georgia and the panhandle of Florida.

In 2005, Buffalo Rock introduced a soft drink called Dr. Wham. Dr. Wham is sold in Buffalo Rock markets where the company does not have the territorial rights to sell Dr Pepper, including markets such as Huntsville, Alabama, Montgomery, Alabama, Columbus, Georgia, Pensacola, Florida, and Staunton, Virginia. A complete listing of markets that carry Dr. Wham is on the Buffalo Rock website.

See also
 List of bottling companies

References

External links
Buffalo Rock website
Grapico Official Website
Buffalo Rock Ginger Ale Official Site
Buffalo Rock Ginger Ale on BhamWiki.com

Companies based in Birmingham, Alabama
Privately held companies based in Alabama
Food and drink companies established in 1901
Ginger ale
PepsiCo bottlers
1901 establishments in Alabama
Drink companies of the United States